Solute carrier family 25 (mitochondrial carrier; Graves disease autoantigen), member 16 is a protein in humans that is encoded by the SLC25A16 gene.

This gene encodes a protein that contains three tandemly repeated mitochondrial carrier protein domains. The encoded protein is localized in the inner membrane and facilitates the rapid transport and exchange of molecules between the cytosol and the mitochondrial matrix space. This gene has a possible role in Graves' disease. [provided by RefSeq, Jul 2008].

References

Further reading 

Human proteins
Solute carrier family